Kalamazoo Lake is a lake  in Allegan County, Michigan. The Kalamazoo River connects Kalamazoo Lake with Lake Michigan, the river flows northwest through Otsego, Allegan and Saugatuck, into Lake Michigan. 

See also 
 Kalamazoo River

References  

Lakes of Allegan County, Michigan